Salim Idris ( Salīm Idrīs) (born 1958) is the former Chief of Staff of the Supreme Military Council (SMC) of the Syrian National Army, a Syrian armed opposition group. He has a PhD in "electronic radars" and speaks five languages, including English. An East German-trained electronics professor, he was a general in the Syrian Army when he defected in July 2012. Idris is widely considered to represent the moderate elements of Syria's armed opposition, as armed opposition leaders under his leadership have subscribed to the pro-democracy Proclamation of Principles.

Military activities
Idris was elected as the Chief of Staff of the Supreme Military Council following its establishment in a conference held in Turkey on 15 December 2012. At the conference, over 550 members of the Syrian revolutionary council, brigades, and battalion commands elected 261 representatives to form the Revolutionary Force Authority. Thirty members were elected to form the SMC, which includes five combat Fronts covering Syria's 14 provinces.

In December 2013, Idris was initially reportedly driven out of his headquarters in northern Syria by the Islamic Front into exile in Doha, Qatar, but U.S. officials later said he was in Turkey throughout the incursion. However, the FSA has denied that Idris has left Syria. A few days later, Syrian National Coalition (SNC) Chief of Staff Monzer Akbik said that Idris "has failed to make an institution, I don't think everything can continue in the same way."

Idris was removed from his position as Chief-of-Staff of the FSA's Supreme Military Council in an announcement on 16 February 2014. He was replaced with Brigadier General Abdul-Ilah al-Bashir.

Political activities
Idris has become increasingly engaged with soliciting aid from Western nations since his initial request of specialized training and non-lethal material support from the United States in February 2013. On 30 April 2013 the United States began deliveries of ready-to-eat rations and Warrior Aid and Litter Kits (WALK) to the Free Syrian Army under the oversight of Idris, in what was the first U.S. delivery of tangible aid to Syria's armed opposition. 

In May 2013, U.S. Senator John McCain crossed into Syria from Turkey to meet with Idris. Idris has issued letters and statements to Secretary of State John Kerry, President Barack Obama, and the United Nations Security Council to encourage international intervention and support in the ongoing Syrian Civil War. In an 8 June 2013 interview with the New York Times, Idris outlined that continued international support for the Free Syrian Army, including "game-changing weapons," were required as a precondition for his attendance at planned negotiations with Bashar al-Assad in Geneva.

In 2019 Idris was appointed to the post of Minister of Defence of the Syrian Interim Government and was thus appointed as commander-in-chief of the Syrian National Army. As such, he led the SNA into the 2019 Turkish offensive into north-eastern Syria, alongside the Turkish Armed Forces. Idris stated that Turkey-backed Syrian rebels "stand in full force in support of our Turkish brothers in fighting all forms of terrorism represented by the PKK gangs."

References

1958 births
Living people
Syrian generals
Defectors to the Free Syrian Army
People from Homs Governorate